The olivaceous elaenia (Elaenia mesoleuca) is a species of bird in the family Tyrannidae. Different authorities use either Deppe or Lichtenstein (both 1830) as the original citation for this species description. It is found in Argentina, Brazil, Paraguay, and Uruguay.

Its natural habitats are temperate forests, subtropical or tropical moist lowland forests, subtropical or tropical moist montane forests, and heavily degraded former forest.

References

olivaceous elaenia
Birds of Brazil
Birds of Paraguay
Birds of Uruguay
olivaceous elaenia
olivaceous elaenia
Taxonomy articles created by Polbot